Arnold Parsons (born 25 December 1926) is an English former wrestler.

Wrestling career
Parsons competed for Great Britain in the 1948 Summer Olympics. He represented England and won a bronze medal in the -62 kg division at the 1950 British Empire Games in Auckland, New Zealand.

References

External links
Scrapbook of photos and newspaper clippings from Parsons' career in wrestling

1926 births
Living people
British male sport wrestlers
Olympic wrestlers of Great Britain
Wrestlers at the 1948 Summer Olympics
Commonwealth Games medallists in wrestling
Commonwealth Games bronze medallists for England
Wrestlers at the 1950 British Empire Games
Medallists at the 1950 British Empire Games